William Cogswell (August 23, 1838 – May 22, 1895) was a U.S. Representative from Massachusetts and a colonel in the Union Army during the American Civil War who was appointed to the grade of brevet brigadier general, U.S. Volunteers.

Biography
Cogswell was born in Bradford, Massachusetts, to George Cogswell and Abigail (Parker) Cogswell. Cogswell's father was a well-respected surgeon and one of the founders of the Massachusetts Republican Party. His grandfather, William Cogswell, was a surgeon's mate in the Revolutionary War who practiced medicine in Atkinson, New Hampshire, and gave land for the Atkinson Academy. Abigail's mother died when he was about 7 years old.

Cogswell attended Atkinson Academy, Kimball Union Academy in Meriden, New Hampshire, Phillips Academy in Andover, Massachusetts, and Dartmouth College in Hanover, New Hampshire.

Cogswell entered Dartmouth in 1855, leaving it soon after. From 1856 to 1857 he went on a voyage around the world, spending two years as a sailor. When Cogswell returned from his voyage he entered Harvard Law School.

Law practice
On September 8, 1860, Cogswell was admitted to the bar in Essex County, Massachusetts. He worked for a while in the office of Attorney William D. Northend, and in April 1861 Cogswell opened his own office in Salem, Massachusetts.

Military service

Cogswell was a private in the Second Corps of Cadets, a militia organization of the Commonwealth of Massachusetts. Cogswell served in the Second Corps of Cadets during the winter of 1860–1861.

On April 19, 1861, word reached Salem that the Sixth Massachusetts had been attacked in Baltimore while on its way to defend Washington, D.C. Cogswell turned his office into a recruiting station and in 24 hours raised a full company, the first company in the country recruited for the war. This became Company C of the Second Massachusetts Volunteers, with Cogswell as captain in command.
  
Cogswell was commissioned a captain in the Second Massachusetts Volunteer Infantry Regiment, May 11, 1861. He was promoted to lieutenant colonel on October 23, 1862, and to colonel on June 25, 1863.

Colonel Cogswell was appointed brevet brigadier general of volunteers by appointment of President Abraham Lincoln on December 12, 1864, to rank from December 15, 1864, and the appointment was confirmed by the United States Senate on February 14, 1865. Colonel and Brevet Brigadier General Cogswell was mustered out of the U.S. Volunteers on July 24, 1865.

After the Civil War Cogswell resumed the practice of his profession.

Political activities
He served as mayor of Salem 1867–1869, 1873, and 1874. He served as member of the Massachusetts House of Representatives 1870, 1871, and 1881–1883. He served in the Massachusetts State Senate in 1885 and 1886. He served as delegate to the Republican National Convention in 1892.

Congressional service
Cogswell was elected as a Republican to the 50th United States Congress and to the four succeeding Congresses and served from March 4, 1887, until his death in Washington, D.C., May 22, 1895.
He was interred in Harmony Grove Cemetery, Salem, Massachusetts.

Personal life
Cogswell married Emma Thorndike Proctor on June 20, 1865. They had two children, William and Emma Silsby Cogswell. Emma died on April 1, 1877. Cogswell remarried to Eva M. Davis on December 12, 1881 and they remained married until his death, having no children.

See also

List of American Civil War brevet generals (Union)
List of Massachusetts generals in the American Civil War
Massachusetts in the American Civil War
List of United States Congress members who died in office (1790–1899)

Notes

References
 Eicher, John H. and Eicher, David J. Civil War High Commands. Stanford, CA: Stanford University Press, 2001. .
 [https://books.google.com/books?id=Av0UAAAAYAAJ Memorial Addresses on the Life and Character of William Cogswell (late a Representative from Massachusetts)]: Delivered in the House of Representatives and Senate, Fifty-fourth Congress, First and Second Sessions (1897).

External links
 Retrieved on 2008-02-12
 William Cogswell as a member of the 50th Congress Massachusetts Delegation.

1838 births
1895 deaths
Phillips Academy alumni
Republican Party members of the Massachusetts House of Representatives
Union Army generals
People of Massachusetts in the American Civil War
Dartmouth College alumni
Harvard Law School alumni
Mayors of Salem, Massachusetts
Republican Party members of the United States House of Representatives from Massachusetts
19th-century American politicians
People from Bradford, Massachusetts
Burials at Harmony Grove Cemetery
People from Atkinson, New Hampshire